Blackswamp is a locality in the Western Downs Region, Queensland, Australia.

History 
Blackswamp Provisional School opened circa 1912 and closed circa 1914. It was located on the northern corner of the junction of Blackswamp Road and Burns Road.

References 

Western Downs Region
Localities in Queensland